Ambedkar Nagar  is a district in the Indian state of  Uttar Pradesh. This district is a part of Faizabad division (officially Ayodhya division) in the Awadh region of the state. This district was established on 29 September 1995 by carving out  parts of the erstwhile Faizabad district (now Ayodhya district). It was created by the then Chief Minister Mayawati and named in memory of Bhimrao Ambedkar, who worked for the advancement of the deprived classes, women and other weaker sections of society. The total area of Ambedkar Nagar district is 2350 Sq. Km.

Geography

Topography
Ambedkar Nagar is located on the north-eastern part of Uttar Pradesh. It lies between 26° 09' N to 26° 40' N latitudes and 82° 12' E to 83° 05' E longitudes. It is bounded on the north by Basti and Sant Kabir Nagar districts, on the north-east by Gorakhpur district, on the south by Sultanpur district, on the west by Faizabad district, on the east by Azamgarh district, and on the south east by Shahganj tehsil of Jaunpur district. The total area of the district is >.

The district of Ambedkar Nagar forms a part of the central Ganga basin. The soils of the Ambedkar Nagar district are alluvium.

The Sarayu river is the main river and is located at the northern boundary of the district. The Tanda, Rajesultanpur, Ramnagar and Baskhari blocks are located along this river and use its water for irrigation. Irrigation in the Baskhari block is also from Lake Devhat, the Rajesultanpur Lake and the Hanswar Lake. Lake Darvan provides water in the Katehari block. The Akbarpur, Bhiti, Bhiyaon, and Jalalpur blocks depend upon smaller rivers and seasonal streams. The city of Akbarpur is situated on the banks of the River Tons (Tamsa), which divides the city into the two parts Akbarpur and Shahzadpur, with the latter being the main commercial centre of the city.

Climate
The climate of the district resembles that of eastern Uttar Pradesh. It is characterised by a rhythm of seasons, which are produced by south-west and north-east monsoon. The reversal of winds takes place twice a year. The climate of the district may be classified into three distinct seasons.
 Cold weather season (November to February)
 Hot weather season (March to mid-June)
 Season of rains (mid-June to October)

The cold weather season lasts from November to February. In November, the belt of high pressure extends from north-west India and covers the whole of the Uttar Pradesh. The temperature beings to decline and the maximum and minimum are  respectively, in this month. The prevailing winds blow from west to east and are influenced by the pressure distribution and pattern of the Himalayas.

Demography

According to the 2011 census Ambedkar Nagar district has a population of 2,397,888, This gives it a ranking of 186th in India (out of a total of 640). Its population growth rate over the decade 2001-2011 was 18.35%. Ambedkar Nagar has a sex ratio of 976 females for every 1000 males, and a literacy rate of 74.37%. Scheduled Castes made up 24.65% of the population.

The distribution of population in each block is controlled by physical conditions and socio-economic causes. Akbarpur block has the highest share of population (16.56%), followed by Jalalpur (13.80%), Tanda (12.32%), Ramnagar (10.26%), Katehri (10.03%), Bhiyaon (9.78%), Baskhari (9.53%), Jahangirganj (9.17%) and Bhiti (8.55%).

Religion

Hinduism is major religion in Ambedkar Nagar district with 1.985.654 Hindus (82.81%). Islam is second largest religion with 401,678 Muslims (16.75%). Other religions includes 2.536 Christians (0.11%), 1.817 Buddhists (0.08%), 869 Sikhs (0.04%), 235 Jains (0.01%), 5.066 did not stated (0.21%) and 33 did other (<0.01%).

Languages

The official languages of the district are Hindi and Urdu. The most spoken languages of Ambedkar Nagar district are Hindi and Awadhi.

At the time of the 2011 Census of India, 79.45% of the population in the district spoke Hindi, 10.71% Awadhi, 8.09% Urdu and 1.63% Bhojpuri as their first language.

Cities and towns

Ambedkar Nagar Nagar Panchayat and Nagar Palika
 Akbarpur
 Tanda
 Rajesultanpur
 Jalalpur
 Ashrafpur Kichhauchha
 Iltifatganj
 Jahangir Ganj

Blocks
 Akbarpur
 Baskhari
 Bhiti
 Bhiyaon
 Jahangir Ganj
 Jalalpur
 Katehari
 Ramnagar, Alapur
 Tanda

Economy
Ambedkar Nagar is known for its textile industry, power plant, sugar plant and cement manufacturing plant. Tanda town is well known for its "Tanda Terrycot". The major economic activity of the district is agro-based industries, firms small, power looms and farming. There is a thermal power plant belonging to the NTPC called Tanda thermal power plant at Makhdoom Nagar area near Tanda. Jaypee Group (Jaypee Ayoudha Greeding) has set up a cement manufacturing plant at Naseebjot Village near Tanda. The district has a sugar factory called Akbarpur Sugar Mill, which is situated near Mijhaura, about ten kilometres from the district headquarters. Akbarpur is a very important town and district headquarter of Ambedkar Nagar district with active participation in the production of plastic along with farm based products.

In 2006 the Ministry of Panchayati Raj named Ambedkar Nagar one of the country's 250 most backward districts (out of a total of 640). It is one of the 34 districts in Uttar Pradesh currently receiving funds from the Backward Regions Grant Fund Programme (BRGF).

Tourism
The shrine of Ashraf Jahangir Semnani is located in Kicchocha Sharif (Kichhauchha Sharif).

Transport

Bus stations
 Akbarpur(Akbarpur,Ayodhya,Sultanpur Depot)
 Tanda(Ayodhya Depot)
 Rajesultanpur(Azamgarh, Ambedkar Nagar Depot)
 Baskhari(Akabrpur Depot)

Education

Medical and engineering colleges

 Mahamaya Rajkiya Allopathic Medical College, a government Medical college in SaddarPur Tanda
 Rajkiya Engineering College, Ambedkar Nagar, a government Engineering College in Ambedakar Nagar 
 Mahamaya College of Agricultural Engineering and Technology, a government Agriculture Engineering college in Akbarpur
 VJV College of Technology, Ramnagar

Other colleges

 Ramabai Government Women Post Graduate College
 BBS PG College. Rajesultanpur
 Pt. Ram Lakhan Shukla Rajkeey Post Graduate College Alapur
 SLJB PG College
 Gandhi Smarak Inter College, Rajesultanpur
 Rahul Sankrityayan Inter College Rajesultanpur
 RMRS PG College
 Raj Inter College, Rajesultanpur
Gandhi Smarak Inter College, Natthupur Laudhna

Media
Ambedkar Nagar has some active media groups which continuously give news updates on Ambedkar Nagar news in Hindi, including breaking news and current news. These media groups include Amar Ujala, Dainik Jagaran, Avadhnama Urdu Dainik Bhaskar, Hindustan and Soochna News.

Notable people

 Masood Ahmad, Ex-MLA Tanda and member of the 1993 Legislative Assembly of Uttar Pradesh of India.
 Muhammad Madni Ashraf Ashrafi Al-Jilani, Grand Mufti of India and Islamic scholar, Sufi, author
 Syed Amin Ashraf (1931-2013), Urdu poet and academic at Department of English, Aligarh Muslim University, from Kichaucha Sharif
 Syed Waheed Ashraf, Sufi poet and scholar of Persian and Urdu languages hailing from Kichaucha Sharif in Ambedkar Nagar district
 Mahdi Hasan, anatomist and Padma Shree awardee
 Anwar Jalalpuri (1947 - 2 January 2018) an Urdu poet from Jalalpur, Ambedkar Nagar, who translated the Bhagavad Gita from Sanskrit to Urdu.
 Ram Manohar Lohia, politician from Akbarpur
 Hashmi Miya, Muslim scholar, Sufi, author, also known as Syed Mohammed Hashmi Ashrafi Al Jilani
 Azimulhaq Pahalwan, Ex-MLA Tanda and member of the Sixteenth Legislative Assembly of Uttar Pradesh of India.
 Hari Om Pandey, member of parliament from BJP
 Rakesh Pandey, MLA Jalalpur from Samajvadi Party and Ex-MP Ambedkar Nagar from Bahujan Samajvadi Party.
 Ritesh Pandey, MP Ambedkar Nagar and Ex-MLA from Jalalpur from Bahujan Samajvadi Party
 Arunima Sinha, first Indian woman amputee to climb Mount Everest
 Naseem Khan (politician) Indian National Congress
 Lalji Verma Ex. Minister Uttar Pradesh government and leader of the BSP legislative assembly.
 Ram Murti Verma MLA from Tanda, member of Samajwaadi Party, former minister in Akhilesh Yadav's government, ex-MLA from Akbarpur.

References

 
Districts of Uttar Pradesh
1995 establishments in Uttar Pradesh